The Plage de Pompierre is a beach of Terre-de-Haut, one of two islands in the archipelago of the Îles des Saintes in the French Antilles. It is 800 metres long, and overlooks  Pompierre Bay on the northeast coast of the island, and is protected from the trade winds by the presence of an islet. It is the most sought after by tourists and is planted with coconut trees.

The Bay has been classified as a natural site under the terms of the so-called Law of 2 May 1930. Motor boats and sailing boats are strictly prohibited from entering or anchoring in it.

References

Geography of Îles des Saintes